Blue Tunnel may refer to:

 Aonodōmon
 Blue Tunnel Project